The 1949 Stanford Indians football team represented Stanford University in the 1949 college football season. Stanford was led by fifth-year head coach Marchmont Schwartz.  The team was a member of the Pacific Coast Conference and played their home games at Stanford Stadium in Stanford, California.

Schedule

Game summaries

Harvard
This season marked the only time that Stanford and Harvard played each other, with the Indians winning handily, 44–0. It was Harvard's second-ever West Coast game, after their victory in 1920 Rose Bowl. A second game, to be played at Harvard Stadium, was scheduled for the 1950 season, but was canceled by Harvard to lighten what was characterized as a "far too heavy" schedule."

California
In the Big Game, California was ranked #3 and had gone to the Rose Bowl the previous season. Stanford came into the game with one conference loss; a win over Cal would have given them a tie for the conference championship and a possible bid to the Rose Bowl. But although the Indians managed a 7–6 halftime lead, the Bears took control in the second half, going on to win 33–14 and securing a return to the Rose Bowl.

Pineapple Bowl
Stanford was invited to the Pineapple Bowl following the season. As this bowl always matched Hawaii against a mainland team, Stanford does not count the game as a postseason bowl. Stanford jumped out to a 20-point first quarter lead, and tacked on six fourth quarter touchdowns to win handily, 74–20.

Players drafted by the NFL

References

Stanford
Stanford Cardinal football seasons
Pineapple Bowl champion seasons
Stanford Indians football